Salsky (masculine), Salskaya (feminine), or Salskoye (neuter) is the name of several rural localities in Russia.

Modern localities
Salskoye, Kaliningrad Oblast, a settlement in Kovrovsky Rural Okrug of Zelenogradsky District in Kaliningrad Oblast
Salskoye, Primorsky Krai, a selo in Dalnerechensky District of Primorsky Krai

Alternative names
Salskaya, alternative name of Salyn Tugtun, a settlement in Salyntugtunskaya Rural Administration of Sarpinsky District in the Republic of Kalmykia;